The extinction risk of climate change is the risk of plant and animal species becoming extinct due to the effects of climate change. Every species has evolved to exist within a certain ecological niche, and as climate change represents the long-term alteration of temperature and average weather patterns, it can push climatic conditions outside of the species' niche, ultimately rendering it extinct. Climate change also increases both the frequency and intensity of extreme weather events, which can directly wipe out regional populations of species. Those species occupying coastal and low-lying island habitats can also be rendered extinct by sea level rise; this has already happened with Bramble Cay melomys in Australia.  Finally, climate change has been linked with the increased prevalence and global spread of certain diseases affecting wildlife. This includes Batrachochytrium dendrobatidis, a fungus identified as one of the main drivers of the worldwide decline in amphibian populations. 

As of 2021, 19% of species on the IUCN Red List of Threatened Species are already being impacted by climate change. Out of 4000 species analyzed by the IPCC Sixth Assessment Report, half were found to have shifted their distribution to higher latitudes or elevations in response to climate change. According to IUCN, once a species has lost over half of its geographic range, it is classified as "endangered", which is considered equivalent to a >20% likelihood of extinction over the next 10–100 years. If it loses 80% or more of its range, it is considered "critically endangered", and has a very high (over 50%) likelihood of going extinct over the next 10–100 years.

The IPCC Sixth Assessment Report projected that in the future, 9%-14% of the species assessed would be at a very high risk of extinction under  of global warming over the preindustrial levels, and more warming means more widespread risk, with  placing 12%-29% at very high risk, and  15%-48%. At , 15% of invertebrates (including 12% of pollinators), 11% of amphibians and 10% of flowering plants would be at a very high risk of extinction, while ~49% of insects, 44% of plants, and 26% of vertebrates would be at high risk of extinction. Fulfilling the Paris Agreement goal of  further reduces this to 6% of insects, 8% of plants, and 4% of vertebrates. These estimates do not include the other drivers of the Holocene extinction.

Causes

Climate change has already adversely affected marine and terrestrial ecoregions, including tundras, mangroves, coral reefs, and caves. Consequently, increasing global temperatures have already been pushing some species out of their habitats for decades. A 2003 Nature review of scientific literature had already found changes in range or seasonal behaviour by plant and animal species. Of species showing recent change, 4 out of 5 shifted their ranges towards the poles or higher altitudes, creating "refugee species". Frogs were breeding, flowers blossoming and birds migrating an average 2.3 days earlier each decade; butterflies, birds and plants were moving towards the poles by 6.1 km per decade. 

When the IPCC Fourth Assessment Report was published in 2007, expert assessments concluded that over the last three decades, human-induced warming had likely had a discernible influence on many physical and biological systems, and that regional temperature trends had already affected species and ecosystems around the world. By the time of the Sixth Assessment Report, it was found that for all species for which long-term records are available, half have shifted their ranges poleward (and/or upward for mountain species), while two-thirds have had their spring events occur earlier.

 
Many of the species at risk are Arctic and Antarctic fauna such as polar bears  In the Arctic, the waters of Hudson Bay are ice-free for three weeks longer than they were thirty years ago, affecting polar bears, which prefer to hunt on sea ice. Species that rely on cold weather conditions such as gyrfalcons, and snowy owls that prey on lemmings that use the cold winter to their advantage may be negatively affected. Climate change is also leading to a mismatch between the snow camouflage of arctic animals such as snowshoe hares with the increasingly snow-free landscape.

Then, many species of freshwater and saltwater plants and animals are dependent on glacier-fed waters to ensure a cold water habitat that they have adapted to. Some species of freshwater fish need cold water to survive and to reproduce, and this is especially true with salmon and cutthroat trout. Reduced glacier runoff can lead to insufficient stream flow to allow these species to thrive. Ocean krill, a cornerstone species, prefer cold water and are the primary food source for aquatic mammals such as the blue whale. Marine invertebrates achieve peak growth at the temperatures they have adapted to, and cold-blooded animals found at high latitudes and altitudes generally grow faster to compensate for the short growing season. Warmer-than-ideal conditions result in higher metabolism and consequent reductions in body size despite increased foraging, which in turn elevates the risk of predation. Indeed, even a slight increase in temperature during development impairs growth efficiency and survival rate in rainbow trout.

Species of fish living in cold or cool water can see a reduction in population of up to 50% in the majority of U.S. freshwater streams, according to most climate change models. The increase in metabolic demands due to higher water temperatures, in combination with decreasing amounts of food will be the main contributors to their decline. Additionally, many fish species (such as salmon) utilize seasonal water levels of streams as a means of reproducing, typically breeding when water flow is high and migrating to the ocean after spawning. Because snowfall is expected to be reduced due to climate change, water runoff is expected to decrease which leads to lower flowing streams, affecting the spawning of millions of salmon. To add to this, rising seas will begin to flood coastal river systems, converting them from fresh water habitats to saline environments where indigenous species will likely perish. In southeast Alaska, the sea rises by 3.96 cm/year, redepositing sediment in various river channels and bringing salt water inland. This rise in sea level not only contaminates streams and rivers with saline water, but also the reservoirs they are connected to, where species such as sockeye salmon live. Although this species of Salmon can survive in both salt and fresh water, the loss of a body of fresh water stops them from reproducing in the spring, as the spawning process requires fresh water.

Furthermore, climate change may disrupt ecological partnerships among interacting species, via changes on behaviour and phenology, or via climate niche mismatch. The disruption of species-species associations is a potential consequence of climate-driven movements of each individual species towards opposite directions. Climate change may, thus, lead to another extinction, more silent and mostly overlooked: the extinction of species' interactions. As a consequence of the spatial decoupling of species-species associations, ecosystem services derived from biotic interactions are also at risk from climate niche mismatch. Whole ecosystem disruptions will occur earlier under more intense climate change: under the high-emissions RCP 8.5 scenario, ecosystems in the tropical oceans would be the first to experience abrupt disruption before 2030, with tropical forests and polar environments following by 2050. In total, 15% of ecological assemblages would have over 20% of their species abruptly disrupted around the same time as the warming eventually reaches  under that scenario; in contrast, this would happen to fewer than 2% if the warming were to stay below .

Extinctions attributed to climate change 
Besides Bramble Cay melomys (see below), few recorded species extinctions are thought to have been caused by climate change, as opposed to the other drivers of the Holocene extinction. For example, only 20 of 864 species extinctions are considered by the IUCN to potentially be the result of climate change, either wholly or in part, and the evidence linking them to climate change is typically considered as weak or insubstantial. These species’ extinctions are listed in the table below.

However, there is abundant evidence for local extinctions from contractions at the warm edges of species' ranges. Hundreds of animal species have been documented to shift their range (usually polewards and upwards) as a signal of biotic change due to climate warming. Warm-edge populations tend to be the most logical place to search for causes of climate-related extinctions since these species may already be at the limits of their climatic tolerances. This pattern of warm-edge contraction provides indications that many local extinctions have already occurred as a result of climate change.

Extinction risk estimates

Early estimates 
The first major attempt to estimate the impact of climate change on generalized species' extinction risks was published in the journal Nature in 2004. It suggested that between 15% and 37% of 1103 endemic or near-endemic known plant and animal species around the world would be "committed to extinction" by 2050, as their habitat will no longer be able to support their survival range by then. However, there was limited knowledge at the time about the species' average ability to disperse or otherwise adapt in response to climate change, and about the  minimum average area needed for their persistence, which limited the reliability of their estimate in the eyes of the scientific community. In response, another 2004 paper found that different, yet still plausible assumptions about those factors could result in as few as 5.6% or as many as 78.6% of those 1103 species being committed to extinction, although this was disputed by the original authors.

Between 2005 and 2011, 74 studies analyzing the impact of climate change on various species' extinction risk were published. A 2011 review of those studies found that on average, they projected the loss of 11.2% of species by 2100. However, the average of predictions based on the extrapolation of observed responses was 14.7%, while the model-based estimates were at 6.7%. Further, when using IUCN criteria, 7.6% of species would become threatened based on model predictions, yet 31.7% based on extrapolated observations. The following year, this mismatch between models and observations was primarily attributed to the models failing to properly account for different rates of species relocation and for the emerging competition among species, thus causing them to underestimate extinction risk. 

It found that these areas could lose up to 25% and 50% of their species, respectively: they may or may not be able to survive outside of them. Madagascar alone would lose 60% of its species under , while Fynbos in Western Cape egion of South Africa would lose a third of its species.

All species 
In 2019, the Intergovernmental Science-Policy Platform on Biodiversity and Ecosystem Services (IPBES) released the summary of its Global Assessment Report on Biodiversity and Ecosystem Services. The report estimated that there are 8 million animal and plant species, including 5.5 million insect species. It found that one million species, including 40 percent of amphibians, almost a third of reef-building corals, more than a third of marine mammals, and 10 percent of all insects are threatened with extinction due to five main stressors. The land use change and sea use change was considered the most important stressor, followed by direct exploitation of organisms (i.e. overfishing). Climate change ranked third, followed by pollution and invasive species. Finally, even the lower warming levels of  would "profoundly" reduce geographical ranges of the majority of the world's species, thus making them more vulnerable then they would have been otherwise.

In 2020, a paper studied 538 plant and animal species from around the world and how they responded to rising temperatures. From that sample, they estimated that 16% of all species could go extinct by 2070 under the "moderate" climate change scenario RCP 4.5, but it could be one-third under RCP 8.5, the scenario of continually increasing emissions. This finding was later cited in the IPCC Sixth Assessment Report. 

The following year, this was disputed by the Tohoku University Earth science scholar Kunio Kaiho. Based on his reanalysis of sedimentary rock record, he estimated that the loss of over 60% of marine species and over 35% of marine genera was correlated to a > global cooling and a  global warming, while for the terrestrial tetrapods, the same losses would be seen under ~ of global cooling or warming. 

This was defined by the paper as a minor mass extinction, comparable to the end-Guadalupian and Jurassic–Cretaceous boundary events. It also cautioned that warming needed to be kept below  to prevent an extinction of >10% of animal species. Finally, it estimated that a minor nuclear war (defined as a nuclear exchange between India and Pakistan or an event of equivalent magnitude) would cause extinctions of 10–20% of species on its own, while a major nuclear war (defined as a nuclear exchange between United States and Russia) would cause the extinctions of 40-50% species.

In July 2022, a survey of 3331 biodiversity experts estimated that since the year 1500, around 30% (between 16% and 50%) of all species have been threatened with extinction - including the species which had already gone extinct. With regards to climate change, the experts estimated that  threatens or drives to extinction about 25% of the species, although their estimates ranged from 15% to 40%. When asked about  warming, they believed it would threaten or drive into extinction 50% of the species, with the range between 32 and 70%.

February 2022 IPCC Sixth Assessment Report included median and maximum estimates of the percentage of species at high risk of extinction for every level of warming, with the maximum estimates increasing much more than the medians.

Vertebrates 
A 2013 paper looked at 12 900 islands in the Pacific Ocean and Southeast Asia which host over 3000 vertebrates, and how they would be affected by sea level rise of 1, 3 and 6 meters (with the last two levels not anticipated until after this century). Depending on the extent of sea level rise, 15–62% of islands studied would be completely underwater, and 19–24% will lose 50–99% of their area. This was correlated with the total habitat loss for 37 species under 1 meter of sea level rise, and for 118 species under 3 meters. A subsequent paper found that under RCP 8.5, the scenario of continually increasing greenhouse gas emissions, numerous vulnerable and endangered vertebrate species living on the low-lying islands in the Pacific Ocean would be threatened by high waves at the end of the century, with the risk substantially reduced under the more moderate RCP 4.5 scenario.  

This estimate was later directly cited in the IPCC Sixth Assessment Report. According to the IUCN Red List criteria, such a range loss is sufficient to classify as species as "endangered", and it is considered equivalent to >20% likelihood of extinction over the 10–100 years.

In 2022, a Science Advances paper estimated that local extinctions of 6% of vertebrates alone would occur by 2050 under the "intermediate"  SSP2-4.5 scenario, and 10.8% under the pathway of continually increasing emissions SSP5-8.5. By 2100, those would increase to ~13% and ~27%, respectively. These estimates included local extinctions from all causes, not just climate change: however, it was estimated to account for the majority (~62%) of extinctions, followed by secondary extinctions or coextinctions (~20%), with land use change and invasive species combined accounting for less than 20%.

In 2023, a study estimated the proportion of vertebrates which would exposed to extreme heat beyond what they were known to have experienced historically in at least half their distribution by the end of the century. On the other hand, SSP1–2.6 ( by 2100) would only see 6.1% of vertebrate species exposed to unprecendented heat in at least of their area, while SSP2–4.5 ( by 2100) and SSP3–7.0 (( by 2100) would see 15.1% and 28.8%, respectively.

Amphibians 

A 2013 study estimated that 670–933 amphibian species (11–15%) are both highly vulnerable to climate change while already being on the IUCN Red List of threatened species. A further 698–1,807 (11–29%) amphibian species are not currently threatened, but could become threatened in the future due to their high vulnerability to climate change.

At , 11% of amphibians and 24% of salamanders would be at a very high risk of extinction. 

A 2022 study estimated that while right now, 14.8% of the global range of all anurans (frogs) is in an extinction risk area, this will increase to 30.7% by 2100 under Shared Socioeconomic Pathway SSP1-2.6 (low emission pathway), 49.9% under SSP2-4.5, 59.4% under SSP3-7.0 and 64.4% under the highest-emitting SSP5-8.5. Extreme-sized anuran species are disproportionately affected: while currently only 0.3% of these species have >70% of their range in a risk area, this number will increase to 3.9% under SSP1-2.6, 14.2% under SSP2-4.5, 21.5% under SSP3-7 and 26% under SSP5-8.5 

A 2018 paper estimated that both Miombo Woodlands of South Africa and southwestern Australia would lose around 90% of their amphibians if the warming were to reach .

Birds 

In 2012, it was estimated that on average, every degree of warming results in between 100 to 500 land bird extinctions. A 2013 study estimated that 608–851 bird species (6–9%) are highly vulnerable to climate change while being on the IUCN Red List of threatened species, and 1,715–4,039 (17–41%) bird species are not currently threatened but could become threatened due to climate change in the future.

In Australia, it was predicted that while emus would survive as a species, some local populations may be wiped out by fires, with the coastal emus of New South Wales considered at high risk. 

A 2012 study connected climate change with the observed decline in numbers and range reduction of the rusty blackbird, a formerly common yet currently vulnerable North American species. In 2015, it was projected that native forest birds in Hawaii would be threatened with extinction due to the spread of avian malaria under the high-warming RCP 8.5 scenario or a similar scenario from earlier modelling, but would persist under the less extreme RCP 4.5 

The Miombo Woodlands of South Africa are predicted to lose about 86% of their birds if the warming reaches . In 2019, it was also estimated that multiple bird species endemic to southern Africa's Kalahari Desert (Southern Pied Babblers, Southern Yellow-billed Hornbills and Southern Fiscals) would either be all-but-lost from it or reduced to its eastern fringes by the end of the century, depending on the emission scenario. While the temperatures are not projected to become so high as to kill the birds outright, they would still be high enough to prevent them from sustaining sufficient body mass and energy for breeding. By 2022, breeding success of the Southern Yellow-billed Hornbills was already observed to collapse in the hottest, southern parts of the desert. It was predicted that those particular subpopulations would disappear by 2027. Similarly, it was found that two Ethiopian bird species, White-tailed Swallow and Ethiopian Bush-crow, would lose 68-84% and >90% of their range by 2070. As their existing geographical range is already very limited, this means that it would likely end up too small to support a viable population even under the scenario of limited climate change, rendering these species extinct in the wild. 

Climate change is particularly threatening to penguins. A 27-year study of the largest colony of Magellanic penguins in the world, published in 2014, found that extreme weather caused by climate change kills 7% of penguin chicks in an average year, accounting for up to 50% of all chick deaths in some years. Since 1987, the number of breeding pairs in the colony has reduced by 24%. It was also estimated that while Adélie penguins will retain some of its habitat past 2099, one-third of colonies along the West Antarctic Peninsula (WAP) will be in decline by 2060. Those colonies are believed to represent about 20% of the entire species.

Fish 

It has been projected in 2015 that many fish species will migrate towards the North and South poles as a result of climate change. Under the highest emission scenario RCP 8.5, 2 new species would enter (invade) per 0.5° of latitude in the Arctic Ocean and 1.5 in the Southern Ocean. It woul also result in an average of 6.5 local extinctions per 0.5° of latitude outside of the poles.

In 2019, IPBES Global Assessment Report on Biodiversity and Ecosystem Services estimated that, depending on the global warming scenarios, ocean net primary production would decline by 3% to 10% by the end of the century, while fish biomass would decline by 3% to 25%.

A 2022 paper found that 45% of all marine species at risk of extinction are affected by climate change, but it's currently less damaging to their survival than overfishing, transportation, urban development and water pollution. However, if the emissions were to rise unchecked, then by the end of the century climate change would become as important as all of them combined. Continued high emissions until 2300 would then risk a mass extinction equivalent to Permian-Triassic extinction event, or "The Great Dying". On the other hand, staying at low emissions would reduce future climate-driven extinctions in the oceans by over 70%.

A warming of  would threaten 8-36% of freshwater fish species with such range loss and  would threaten 24-63%. The different percentages represent different assumptions about how well freshwater fishes could disperse to new areas and thus offset past range losses, with the highest percentages assuming no dispersal is possible. According to the IUCN Red List criteria, such a range loss is sufficient to classify as species as "endangered", and it is considered equivalent to >20% likelihood of extinction over the 10–100 years.

Mammals 

In 2020, a study in Nature Climate Change estimated the effects of Arctic sea ice decline on polar bear populations (which  rely on the sea ice to hunt seals) under two climate change scenarios. Under high greenhouse gas emissions, at most a few high-Arctic populations will remain by 2100: under more moderate scenario, the species will survive this century, but several major subpopulations will still be wiped out.

In 2019, it was estimated that the current great ape range in Africa will decline massively under both the severe RCP 8.5 scenario and the more moderate RCP 4.5. The apes could potentially disperse to new habitats, but those would lie almost completely outside of their current protected areas, meaning that conservation planning needs to be "urgently" updated to account for this. 

In the wake of 2019 Amazon rainforest wildfires, the World Wildlife Fund concluded that the jaguar  is already "near threatened" and the loss of food supplies and habitat due to the fires make the situation more critical. The fires affect water chemistry (such as decreasing the amount of dissolved oxygen in the water), temperature, and erosion rates, which in turn affects fish and mammals that depend on fish, such as the giant otter (Pteronura brasiliensis).

A 2017 analysis found that the mountain goat populations of coastal Alaska would go extinct sometime between 2015 and 2085 in half of the considered scenarios of climate change. Another analysis found that the Miombo Woodlands of South Africa are predicted to lose about 80% of their mammal species if the warming reached .

In 2008, the white lemuroid possum was reported to be the first known mammal species to be driven extinct by climate change. However, these reports were based on a misunderstanding. One population of these possums in the mountain forests of North Queensland is severely threatened by climate change as the animals cannot survive extended temperatures over 30 °C. However, another population 100 kilometres south remains in good health. On the other hand, the Bramble Cay melomys, which lived on a Great Barrier Reef island, was reported as the first mammal to go extinct due to human-induced sea level rise, with the Australian government officially confirming its extinction in 2019. Another Australian species, the greater stick-nest rat (Leporillus conditor) may be next. Similarly, the 2019–20 Australian bushfire season caused a near-complete extirpatin of Kangaroo Island dunnarts, as only one individual may have survived out of the population of 500. Those bushfires have also caused the loss of 8,000 koalas  in New South Wales alone, further endangering the species.

Reptiles 
In a 2010 study led by Barry Sinervo, researchers surveyed 200 sites in Mexico which showed 24 local extinctions (also known as extirpations), of Sceloporus lizards since 1975. Using a model developed from these observed extinctions the researchers surveyed other extinctions around the world and found that the model predicted those observed extirpations, thus attributing the extirpations around the world to climate warming. These models predict that extinctions of the lizard species around the world will reach 20% by 2080, but up to 40% extinctions in tropical ecosystems where the lizards are closer to their ecophysiological limits than lizards in the temperate zone.

A 2015 study looked at the persistence of common lizard populations in Europe under future climate change. It found that under , 11% of the lizard population would be threatened with local extinction around 2050 and 14% by 2100.

Sex ratios for sea turtles in the Caribbean are being affected because of climate change. Environmental data were collected from the annual rainfall and tide temperatures over the course of 200 years and showed an increase in air temperature (mean of 31.0 degree Celsius). These data were used to relate the decline of the sex ratios of sea turtles in the North East Caribbean and climate change. The species of sea turtles include Dermochelys coriacea, Chelonia myads, and Eretmochelys imbricata. Extinction is a risk for these species as the sex ratio is being afflicted causing a higher female to male ratio. Projections estimate the declining rate of male Chelonia myads as 2.4% hatchlings being male by 2030 and 0.4% by 2090.

Invertebrates 
This includes 12% of pollinator species.

Arachnids 
A 2018 study examined the impact of climate change on Troglohyphantes cave spiders in the Alps and found that even the low-emission scenario RCP 2.6 would reduce their habitat by ~45% by 2050, while the high emission scenario would reduce it by ~55% by 2050 and ~70% by 2070. The authors suggested that this may be sufficient to drive the most restricted species to extinction.

Corals 

Almost no other ecosystem is as vulnerable to climate change as coral reefs. However, it was found in 2021 that each square meter of coral reef area contains about 30 invididual corals, and their total number is estimated at half a trillion - equivalent to all the trees in the Amazon, or all the birds in the world. As such, most individual coral reef species are predicted to avoid extinction even as coral reefs would cease to function as the ecosystems we know. A 2013 study found that 47–73 coral species (6–9%) are vulnerable to climate change while already threatened with extinction according to the IUCN Red List, and 74–174 (9–22%) coral species were not vulnerable to extinction at the time of publication, but could be threatened under continued climate change, making them a future conservation priority. The authors of the recent coral number estimates suggest that those older projections were too high, although this has been disputed.

Insects 

Insects account for the vast majority of invertebrate species. One of the earliest studies to link insect extinctions to recent climate change was published in 2002, when observations of two populations of Bay checkerspot butterfly found that they were threatened by changes in precipitation. 

A 2014 long-term study of more than 60 bee species published in the journal Science found that climate change causes drastic declines in the population and diversity of bumblebees across North America and Europe, at rates "consistent with a mass extinction." North America's bumblebee populations fell by 46% during the two time periods the study used, which were from 1901 to 1974 and from 2000 to 2014. North America's bumblebee populations fell by 46% because bee populations were hardest hit in warming southern regions such as Mexico. According to the study, there have been more frequent extreme warm years, which exceeded the species’ historical temperature ranges.

Plants 

A 2020 meta-analysis found that while 39% of vascular plant species were likely threatened with extinction, only 4.1% of this figure could be attributed to climate change, with land use change activities predominating. However, the researchers suggested that this may be more representative of the slower pace of research on effects of climate change on plants. For fungi, it estimated that 9.4% are threatened due to climate change, while 62% are threatened by other forms of habitat loss.

Alpine and mountain plant species are known to be some of the most vulnerable to climate change. In 2010, a study looking at 2,632 species located in and around European mountain ranges found that depending on the climate scenario, 36–55% of alpine species, 31–51% of subalpine species and 19–46% of montane species would lose more than 80% of their suitable habitat by 2070–2100. In 2012, it was estimated that for the 150 plant species in the European Alps, their range would, on average, decline by 44%-50% by the end of the century - moreover, lags in their shifts would mean that around 40% of their remaining range would soon become unsuitable as well, often leading to an extinction debt.  In 2022, it was found that those earlier studies simulated abrupt, "stepwise" climate shifts, while more realistic gradual warming would see a rebound in alpine plant diversity after mid-century under the "intermediate" and most intense global warming scenarios RCP 4.5 and RCP 8.5. However, for RCP 8.5, that rebound would be deceptive, followed by the same collapse in biodiversity at the end of the century as simulated in the earlier papers. This is because on average, every degree of warming reduces total species population growth by 7%, and the rebound was driven by colonization of niches left behind by most vulnerable species like Androsace chamaejasme and Viola calcarata going extinct by mid-century or earlier. 

It's been estimated that by 2050, climate change alone could reduce species richness of trees in the Amazon Rainforest by 31–37%, while deforestation alone could be responsible for 19–36%, and the combined effect might reach 58%. The paper's worst-case scenario for both stressors had only 53% of the original rainforest area surviving as a continuous ecosystem by 2050, with the rest reduced to a severely fragmented block.

Another estimate suggests that two prominent species of seagrasses in the Mediterranean Sea would be substantially affected under the worst-case greenhouse gas emission scenario, with Posidonia oceanica losing 75% of its habitat by 2050 and potentially becoming functionally extinct by 2100, while Cymodocea nodosa would lose ~46% of its habitat and then stabilize due to expansion into previously unsuitable areas.

Impacts of species degradation due to climate change on livelihoods 
The livelihoods of nature dependent communities depend on abundance and availability of certain species. Climate change conditions such as increase in atmospheric temperature and carbon dioxide concentration directly affect availability of biomass energy, food, fiber and other ecosystem services. Degradation of species supplying such products directly affect the livelihoods of people relying on them more so in Africa. The situation is likely to be exacerbated by changes in rainfall variability which is likely to give dominance to invasive species especially those that are spread across large latitudinal gradients. The effects that climate change has on both plant and animal species within certain ecosystems has the ability to directly affect the human inhabitants who rely on natural resources. Frequently, the extinction of plant and animal species create a cyclic relationship of species endangerment in ecosystems which are directly affected by climate change.

Species adaptation 

Rising temperatures are beginning to have a noticeable impact on birds, and butterflies nearly 160 species from 10 different zones have shifted their ranges northward by 200 km in Europe and North America. The migration range of larger animals may be constrained by human development. In Britain, spring butterflies are appearing an average of 6 days earlier than two decades ago.

Scientists have observed that Antarctic hair grass is colonizing areas of Antarctica where previously their survival range was limited.ue to the ever hotter weather, birds are forced to move to foreign lands. Other effects of global warming include less snow fall, rising sea levels, Ozone depleting and weather changes. These may influence human activities and the ecosystem.

Climate change has affected the gene pool of the red deer population on Rùm, one of the Inner Hebrides islands, Scotland. Warmer temperatures resulted in deer giving birth on average three days earlier for each decade of the study. The gene which selects for earlier birth has increased in the population because those with the gene have more calves over their lifetime.

A study in Chicago showed that the length of birds' lower leg bones (an indicator of body sizes) shortened by an average of 2.4% and their wings lengthened by 1.3%. A study from central Amazon showed that birds have decreased in mass (an indicator of size) by up to 2% per decade, and increased in wing length by up to 1% per decade, with links to temperature and precipitation shifts. The findings of these studies suggest the morphological changes are the result of climate change, and may demonstrate an example of evolutionary change following Bergmann's rule.

The Jutfelt Fish Ecophysiology lab at the Norwegian University of Science and Technology (NTNU), under their director professor Fredrik Jutfelt, investigates how evolution can lead to physiological adaptation to the temperature environment where the fish live. They recently performed a large artificial selection experiment, published in Proceedings of the National Academy of Sciences of the United States of America (PNAS), showing that evolution of tolerance to warming can occur in fish. The rate of evolution, however, was suggested to be too slow for evolutionary rescue to protect fish from the impacts of climate change.

Prevention 
In addition to reducing future warming to the lowest possible levels, preserving the current and likely near-future habitat of endangered species in protected areas in efforts like 30x30 is a crucial aspect of helping species survive. A more radical approach is the assisted migration of species endangered by climate change to new habitats, whether passively (through measures like the creation of wildlife corridors to allow them to move to a new area unimpeded), or their active transport to new areas. This is approach is more controversial, since some of the rescued species may end up invasive in their new locations. I.e. while it would be relatively easy to move polar bears, which are currently threatened by Arctic sea ice decline, to Antarctica, the damage to Antarctica's ecosystem is considered too great to allow this. Finally, species which are extinct in the wild may be kept alive in artificial surroundings until a suitable natural habitat may be restored. In cases where captive breeding fails, embryo cryopreservation has been proposed as an option of last resort.

Assisted migration 
Assisted migration is the act of moving plants or animals to a different habitat. It has been proposed as a way to rescue species which may not be able to disperse easily, have long generation times or have small populations. This strategy has already been implemented to save multiple tree species in North America. For instance, the Torreya Guardians have coordinated an assisted migration program to save the Torreya taxifolia from extinction.

See also 

 Atelopus varius
 Chytridiomycosis
 Ecosystem services
 Gastric-brooding frog
 Golden toad
 Global catastrophic risk
 Guajira stubfoot toad
 Keystone species
 Paleocene–Eocene Thermal Maximum

Notes

References

External links 
 
 
 
 
 
 

 
Environmental conservation
Climate change, Risk from